Diplocheila is a genus of beetles in the family Carabidae, containing the following 28 species:

 Diplocheila aegyptiaca Dejean, 1831
 Diplocheila assimilis (Leconte, 1844) 
 Diplocheila capensis (Peringuey, 1896) 
 Diplocheila colossus (Bates, 1892) 
 Diplocheila cordicollis Laferte-Senectere, 1851
 Diplocheila crossi Will, 1998 
 Diplocheila daldorfi (Crotch, 1871) 
 Diplocheila distinguenda (Laferte-Senectere, 1851) 
 Diplocheila elongata Bates, 1873
 Diplocheila exotica Andrewes, 1931 
 Diplocheila impressicollis (Dejean, 1831) 
 Diplocheila laevigata Bates, 1892
 Diplocheila laevigotoides Jedlicka, 1936 
 Diplocheila laevis Lesne, 1896
 Diplocheila latifrons Dejean, 1831
 Diplocheila macromandibularis Habu & Tanaka, 1956
 Diplocheila major (Leconte, 1848) 
 Diplocheila minima Jedlicka, 1931
 Diplocheila nupera Casey, 1897 
 Diplocheila obtusa (Leconte, 1848) 
 Diplocheila oregona (Hatch, 1951) 
 Diplocheila perscissa Andrewes, 1921 
 Diplocheila pinodes Andrewes, 1922 
 Diplocheila polita (Fabricius, 1792) 
 Diplocheila striatopunctata (Leconte, 1844) 
 Diplocheila transcaspica Semenov, 1891
 Diplocheila undulata Carr, 1920 
 Diplocheila zeelandica L. Redtenbacher, 1867

References

Licininae